Festival of Praise (FOP) is a Christian Praise and Worship concert started in 1986, attended by various churches in Singapore and Malaysia. It is held annually at the Singapore Indoor Stadium.

Committee
Founder/ Chairman Emeritus: Rev. Dr. Canon James Wong
Chairman: Rev. Yang Tuck Yoong
Vice-Chairman: Ps. Simon Chua
Treasurer: Mr. Danny Koh
Secretary: Ps. Kevin Koh

Notable Attendees
1999 Rev. David Yonggi Cho
2003 Tommy Walker
2005 Delirious?, Hillsong
2006 Rev. Dr. Ed Silvoso, Don Moen, Christian City Church
2007 Rev. Dr. Phil Pringle, Don Moen, Delirious?
2008 Rev. Mark Conner, Reuben Morgan, The Parachute Band
2009 Rev. Mark Conner, Bob Fitts, True Worshippers
2010 Planetshakers, Rev. Dr. Che Ahn, Don Moen
2011 John Bevere, New Life Band, Andrew Yeo
2012 Cancelled
2013 Andy Elmes, Klaus, Andrew Yeo, Cheryl You
2014 Wayne Cordeiro, Tim Hughes, Nikki Fletcher, Andrew Yeo
2015 Jubilee Day of Prayer

References

External links
 Festival of Praise Website
 Festival of Praise Facebook Group

Christianity in Singapore
Music festivals in Singapore